The Council of Thirteen may refer to:

 The name of the ruling body of various fictional villainous species, such as:
 the Yeerks, from the Animorphs book series
 the Skaven, from the miniature wargame Warhammer Fantasy
 The Guild of Calamitous Intent in the Venture Bros universe
 International Council of 13 Indigenous Grandmothers